Cephas Pasipamiri (born 25 September 1975) is a Zimbabwean long distance runner who specialises in the marathon. He competed in the marathon event at the 2015 World Championships in Athletics in Beijing, China.

References

External links

1975 births
Living people
Zimbabwean male long-distance runners
Zimbabwean male marathon runners
World Athletics Championships athletes for Zimbabwe
Place of birth missing (living people)